Hyposmocoma laysanensis is a species of moth of the family Cosmopterigidae. It is endemic to Laysan. The type locality is Guano Rock.

The wingspan is 10–10.5 mm.

The larval case is purse-shaped and is 4.1–7.0 mm in length. It is smooth and cylindrical, bulged and flat in the middle, with growth lines starting at the middle, extending laterally toward two entrances. The background color is shiny dark brown.

Adults were reared from case-making larvae. Larvae were collected on the ground away from shoreline.

External links
New species of Hyposmocoma (Lepidoptera, Cosmopterigidae) from the remote Northwestern Hawaiian Islands of Laysan, Necker, and Nihoa

ekemamao
Endemic moths of Hawaii
Moths described in 2009